Britannia silver is an alloy of silver containing 11 ozt 10 dwt (i.e. 11½ troy oz.) silver in the pound troy, equivalent to , or 95.833% by weight (mass) silver, the rest usually being copper.

This standard was introduced in England by Act of Parliament in 1697 to replace sterling silver (92.5% silver) as the obligatory standard for items of "wrought plate". The lion passant gardant hallmark denoting sterling was replaced with "the figure of a woman commonly called Britannia", and the leopard's head mark of the Worshipful Company of Goldsmiths (in London) replaced with a "lion's head erased".

Britannia standard silver was introduced as part of the great recoinage scheme of William III from 1696, when attempts were made to limit the clipping and melting of sterling silver coinage. A higher standard for wrought plate meant that sterling silver coins could not easily be used as a source of raw material because additional fine silver, which was in short supply at the time, would have to be added to bring the purity of the alloy up to the higher standard.

Britannia silver is considerably softer than sterling, and after complaints from the trade, sterling silver was again authorised for use by silversmiths from 1 June 1720, and thereafter Britannia silver has remained an optional standard for hallmarking in the United Kingdom and Ireland.

Since the hallmarking changes of 1 January 1999, Britannia silver has been denoted by the millesimal fineness hallmark 958, with the symbol of Britannia being applied optionally.

The silver bullion coins of the Royal Mint issued since 1997, known as "Britannias" for their reverse image, were minted in Britannia standard silver until 2012, when they switched to 999 pure silver.

Britannia silver should be distinguished from Britannia metal, a pewter-like alloy containing no silver.

See also
 Sterling silver

References

Bibliography 
 

1697 establishments in England
Silversmithing
Silver
Precious metal alloys